Serum-separating tubes, also known as serum separator tubes or SSTs, are used in clinical chemistry tests requiring blood serum.

SSTs are sometimes called "marble-top tubes", "tiger-tops", or "gold-topped tubes", referring to the stoppers which are either gold, red with a gold ring on top, or marbled red and grey. The stopper of SPS (sodium polyanethol sulfonate) tubes have a paler yellow colour, sometimes causing confusion; these are known as "yellow tops" not "gold". Trademarked versions of the SST include Covidien "Corvac" tubes.

The tubes have micronized silica particles which help clot the blood before centrifugation, and a gel at the bottom which separates whole blood cells from serum.  Silica nanoparticles induce coagulation through contact activation of Hageman factor XII. The silica particles are desiccants, which adsorb and hold water vapor.  This is used in the tubes so the blood adheres to the surface of the tiny silica particles and begins to clot. After the blood sample is centrifuged, the clear serum should be removed for testing.

These tubes should be used with care when measuring drug or hormone levels because the drug or hormone may diffuse from the serum into the gel, causing a reduction in measured level.
The gel in SST II tubes (which appears slightly less opaque) is supposed  to have less effect on drug levels in serum.

See also
 Vacutainer
 Venipuncture

References

Laboratory equipment